Mark V served as Greek Patriarch of Alexandria between 1425 and 1435.

References

15th-century Patriarchs of Alexandria